Dockery Lake Recreation Area, located in northeast Georgia near the town of Dahlonega, is a US Forest Service campground and day-use area constructed next to a small pond. The area, operated by the Forestry Service's Brasstown Ranger District of the Chattahoochee National Forest, is nestled among the Cedar Ridge range of the Blue Ridge Mountains. Situated on a small tributary to Waters Creek, Dockery Lake is a  man-made lake stocked with trout. On the north side of the lake is the beginning of Dockery Lake Trail.

Facilities at the camping area include eleven campsites with no electricity. Five sites are next to the lake; the other six are nearby and are high enough to overlook the lake. The area does not feature electrical service, showers or water hookups for RVs.

Notes

References

External links

 Dockery Lake Recreational Area - US Forest Service official site

Protected areas of Lumpkin County, Georgia
Dockery Lake
Chattahoochee-Oconee National Forest
Landforms of Lumpkin County, Georgia